Delicious Orie is a British amateur boxer who won a bronze medal at the 2022 European Championships and a gold medal at the 2022 Commonwealth Games, representing England.

Orie was born in Moscow to a Nigerian father and a Russian mother, facing racial prejudice due to the colour of his skin. He moved to England at age seven and settled in Wolverhampton a few years later.

References

Living people
Year of birth missing (living people)
Date of birth missing (living people)
British male boxers
Sportspeople from Moscow
Super-heavyweight boxers
English sportspeople of Nigerian descent
English people of Russian descent
Russian emigrants to the United Kingdom
Sportspeople from Wolverhampton
Boxers at the 2022 Commonwealth Games
Commonwealth Games gold medallists for England
Commonwealth Games medallists in boxing
21st-century English people
Medallists at the 2022 Commonwealth Games